The Liberal Jewish Movement of France or MJLF is a Jewish liberal cultural and religious association affiliated with the World Union for Progressive Judaism. Founded in 1977, the movement promotes Jewish religious and cultural life through its two synagogues. The MJLF was created in June 1977 by fifty families under the leadership of Rabbi Daniel Farhi, first President Roger Benarrosh, and Colette Kessler, head of education. Many rabbis have contributed to the development of MJLF, including Daniel Farhi (1977-2009) Stephen Berkowitz, (1989–92;1995-1997; 2004-2013), Oren Postel, Pauline Bebe (1990-1995), Gabriel Farhi (1995-2007), and Célia Surget. Three rabbis currently provide the leadership for the movement: Floriane Chinsky, Yann Boissière, and Delphine Horvilleur.

The MJLF operates a joint synagogue and community center on 11 rue Gaston de Cavaillet in the 15th arrondissement, on the Front de Seine, a few hundred meters from the old "Vel d'Hiv". A second synagogue, established in 1983 to expand in eastern Paris, located at 24 rue du Surmelin in the 20th arrondissement.

See also
 Communauté Juive Libérale
 Union Libérale Israélite de France

Reform synagogues in France
1977 establishments in France
World Union for Progressive Judaism